The women's 10,000 metres walk at the 2010 World Junior Championships in Athletics was held at the Moncton 2010 Stadium on 21 July. A field of 26 athletes from 19 countries competed.

Medalists

Records
Prior to the competition, the existing world junior and championship records were as follows.

No new records were established during the competition.

Results

Key:  DNS = Did not start, DSQ = Disqualified, NJR = National junior record, PB = Personal best, SB = Seasonal best, WJL = World junior leading

Participation
According to an unofficial count, 25 athletes from 17 countries participated in the event.

References

External links
10,000 metres walk results from IAAF. IAAF. Retrieved on 2010-07-21.
13th IAAF World Junior Championships Facts & Figures. IAAF. Retrieved on 2010-07-21.

10,000 metres walk
Racewalking at the World Athletics U20 Championships
2010 in women's athletics